OpenCity is a free and open-source software 3D city-building game started in 2003 by France-based Vietnamese programmer Duong-Khang Nguyen. The game mechanics are similar to Simcity, although the game developers do not strive to make it a direct Simcity clone.

Gameplay 
In the game, the player builds a city by marking land as commercial, industrial or residential zones. Those zones depend on each other to grow. The player is also required to supply the city with power and connect the different zones by building roads.

Origins and development
OpenCity is the product of programmer Duong-Khang Nguyen and 3D artist Frédéric Rodrigo. Nguyen was inspired by the open source game FreeReign; when he realized that the FreeReign project was abandoned and the source code was not in the condition to be improved, he began development on his own city-building simulator. The work in project started in 2003 with the registration on SourceForge. OpenCity is Free and open-source software due to the licensing as GPLv2. Contributions to the game came from the game's community in form of translation and quality testing. OpenCity is built on cross platform libraries and APIs like Simple DirectMedia Library and OpenGL, which allows porting to various OSes and platforms, like Windows, OS X and many Linux distributions.

Latest stable release branch is 0.0.62 with updates from 2011, while the unstable development branch 0.0.7 has updates until 2015.

Reception  
OpenCity achieved a broad spread as free and open-source and freeware video game, and was downloaded directly from SourceForge between 2003 and May 2017 over 190,000 times according to the SF download statistic. OpenCity was also directly integrated in many Linux distributions: Fedora, Debian, Arch Linux, SuSE, Slackware, Ubuntu, Pardus, Frugalware. OpenCity has been reviewed as "well made 3D remake" of SimCity by Chip.de in 2013.

Gallery

See also

 List of open source games
 Lincity
 SimCity
 Simutrans

References

External links

 OpenCity homepage
  OpenCity tutorial

2009 video games
Business simulation games
Open-source video games
City-building games
Linux games
Free software programmed in C++
Video games developed in France